Annette Skotvoll (born September 1, 1968, in Trondheim) is a Norwegian team handball player (goalkeeper) and Olympic medalist. She received silver medals at the 1988 Summer Olympics in Seoul with the Norwegian national team, and at the 1992 Summer Olympics in Barcelona. 

Skotvoll played 250 games for the national team during her career.

References

External links

1968 births
Living people
Norwegian female handball players
Olympic silver medalists for Norway
Olympic handball players of Norway
Handball players at the 1988 Summer Olympics
Handball players at the 1992 Summer Olympics
Handball players at the 1996 Summer Olympics
Sportspeople from Trondheim
Olympic medalists in handball
Medalists at the 1992 Summer Olympics
Medalists at the 1988 Summer Olympics